"Drinkin' My Baby Goodbye" is a song written by Charlie Daniels and performed by the Charlie Daniels Band.  It was released in March 1986 as the third and final single from their album Me and the Boys.  The song reached number 8 on the Billboard Hot Country Singles & Tracks chart.

Chart performance

References

External links
 

1986 singles
Charlie Daniels songs
Songs written by Charlie Daniels
Epic Records singles
Song recordings produced by John Boylan (record producer)
1986 songs
Songs about alcohol